Daniel Scharner (born 26 February 1997) is an Austrian professional footballer who plays as a midfielder for Wiener SC.

References

External links 

1997 births
Living people
Austrian footballers
2. Liga (Austria) players
SKU Amstetten players
Wiener Sport-Club players
Association football midfielders
People from Scheibbs District
Footballers from Lower Austria